Harry Harvey may refer to:

Harry Harvey (Medal of Honor, 1865) (1846–1896), American soldier during Civil War
Harry Harvey (Medal of Honor, 1901) (1873–1929), American Marine during Philippine–American War
Harry Harvey Sr. (1901–1985), American character actor
Harry Harvey Jr. (1929–1978), American actor in Forbidden Planet, son of Harry Harvey Sr.
Harry Harvey (politician), Northern Ireland Assembly member since 2019

See also
Henry Harvey (disambiguation)
Harold Harvey (disambiguation)